This is the discography for Australian-British guitarist John Christopher Williams.  In the following list, compilations or re-editions are denoted by (C) after the album title.

1950s 
 1958 Guitar Recital Volumes 1 & 2 (Delysé)

1960s 
 1961 Folk Songs (with Wilfred Brown: tenor) (L'Oiseau-Lyre)
 1961 A Spanish Guitar (Westminster)
 1963 Twenty Studies for Guitar (Westminster)
 1963 Jacqueline du Pré: Recital (EMI)
 1964 CBS [Columbia] Records Presents John Williams (CBS)
 1965 Virtuoso Music For Guitar (CBS)
 1965 Two Guitar Concertos (Rodrigo and Castelnuovo-Tedesco) (CBS)
 1967 More Virtuoso Music for Guitar (CBS)
 1968 Two Guitar Concertos (Rodrigo and Dodgson) (CBS)
 1968 Haydn and Paganini (CBS)
 1969 Virtuoso Variations for Guitar (CBS)
 1969 Concertos by Vivaldi and Giuliani (CBS)
 1969 Songs for Voice and Guitar (CBS)

1970s 
 1970 John Williams Plays Spanish Music (CBS)
 1970 Webern: Complete Works (CBS/Philips)
 1971 Songs of Freedom – Theodorakis with Maria Farantouri (CBS)
 1971 The Raging Moon (EMI)
 1971 200 Motels (United Artists)
 1971 Changes (Cube Records, Fly Records in the UK)
 1971 Music for Guitar and Harpsichord (CBS)
 1971 Cavatina (C) (Cube Records)
 1972 Guitar Recital (I & II) (C) (Ace of Diamonds)
 1972 Together (a.k.a. Julian and John) (with Julian Bream) (RCA)
 1972 Gowers Chamber Concerto, Scarlatti Sonatas (CBS)
 1972 Previn and Ponce Concertos (CBS)
 1972 Greatest Hits-The Guitar (C) (Columbia)
 1972 John Williams Plays More Spanish Music and Other Favourites (C) (CBS)
 1973 Music from England, Japan, Brazil, Venezuela, Argentina and Mexico (CBS)
 1973 The Height Below (Cube Records)
 1974 Rhapsody (CBS)
 1974 Together Again (a.k.a. Julian and John 2) (with Julian Bream) (RCA)
 1974 Rodrigo & Villa-Lobos (CBS)
 1974 John Williams' Greatest Hits (C) (CBS)
 1974 Schoenberg: Complete Works for Chamber Ensemble (Decca)
 1975 Bach: Complete Lute Music (CBS)
 1976 Best Friends (with Cleo Laine)(RCA)
 1976 Duos (CBS)
 1976 John Williams and Friends (CBS)
 1976 Villa-Lobos and Scarlatti (C) (CBS)
 1977 The Sly Cormorant Argo (Decca)
 1977 John Williams Plays Patrick Gowers (C) (CBS)
 1977 Duos by Paganini and Giuliani (CBS) (with Itzhak Perlman, violin)
 1977 John Williams plays Spanish Favourites (C) (Decca)
 1977 John Williams plays Bach and Scarlatti (C) (Decca)
 1977 Guitar Recital (Double LP) (C) (Decca)
 1977 Castelnuovo-Tedesco, Arnold and Dodgson Concertos (CBS)
 1977 John Williams ~ Barrios (CBS)
 1977 Mermaid Frolics (Polydor)
 1978 Malcolm Arnold and Leo Brouwer Concertos (CBS)
 1978 Stevie (CBS)
 1978 John Williams Plays Paganini (C) (CBS)
 1978 John Williams Collection (C) (CBS)
 1978 Travelling (Cube Records)
 1978 Manuel Ponce (CBS)
 1979 John Williams plays Stephen Dodgson (C) (CBS)
 1979 Julian Bream & John Williams Live (RCA)
 1979 Recollections (C) (CBS)
 1979 Sky (Ariola)
 1979 The Secret Policeman's Ball (Island). Various artists; Williams featured on track "Cavatina"
 1979 The Deer Hunter (Capitol)
 1979 John Williams at His Best (C) (Neon)
 1979 Morning Sky (C) (Cube Records)
 1979 Bridges (C) (Lotus Music/K-Tel)
 1979 Spotlight on John Williams (2LP) (C) (Cube Records)

1980s 
 1980 The Monster Club (soundtrack) 
 1980 Guitar Quintets (CBS)
 1980 The Platinum Collection (2LP) (C) (Cube Records)
 1980 The Guitar Music of John Williams (C) (Tellydisc)
 1980 Sky 2 (Ariola)
 1981 Echoes of Spain – Albeniz (CBS)
 1981 Sky 3 (Ariola)
 1981 Great Performances: Rodrigo - Concierto de Aranjuez / Fantasia Para un Gentilhombre (C) (CBS)
 1982 John Williams and Peter Hurford Play Bach (CBS)
 1982 Sky Forthcoming (Ariola)
 1982 Just Guitars: A Concert in Aid of The Samaritans (CBS)
 1982 Portrait of John Williams (CBS/Sony)
 1983 Sky Five Live (Ariola)
 1983 The Honorary Consul Island (single)
 1983 Let The Music Take You (with Cleo Laine) (CBS/QNote)
 1983 The Guitar is the Song: A Folksong Collectio (CBS/Sony)
 1983 Cadmium ... (Ariola)
 1984 Rodrigo (CBS)
 1985 Bach, Handel, Marcello: Concertos (CBS/Sony)
 1985 Hounds of Love (EMI Manhattan)
 1986 Echoes of London (CBS)
 1986 Classic Aid: Concert in Aid of The UNHCR (CBS)
 1986 The Essential Collection (C) (Castle)
 1986 Le Grand Classique (C) (CBS/Guy Laroche)
 1987 Emma's War (Filmtrax)
 1987 Paul Hart Concerto for Guitar and Jazz Orchestra (CBS/Sony)
 1987 Fragments of a Dream CBS/ (Sony)
 1987 Unforgettable John Williams (C) (Castle)
 1988 A Fish Called Wanda (Milan)
 1988 The Baroque Album (CBS/Sony)
 1988 John Williams – The Collection (C) (Castle)
 1989 Spirit of the Guitar: Music of the Americas (CBS/Sony)
 1989 The Great Guitar Concertos (2CD) (C) (CBS)
 1989 Spanish Guitar Favourites (C) CBS
 1989 Guitar Concertos (2CD) (C) (CBS)
 1989 Rodrigo Concertos (C) (CBS)
 1989 Rodrigo and Albéniz (C) (CBS)
 1989 The Golden Guitar (C) (CBS)

1990s 
 1990 Leyenda (CBS)
 1990 Bach: Four Lute Suites (C) (CBS)
 1990 Vivaldi Concertos (Sony)
 1990 Spanish Guitar Music (C) (Essential Classics)
 1991 Guitar Recital (C) (Decca)
 1991 Latin American Guitar Music by Barrios and Ponce (C) (Essential Classics)
 1991 Rodrigo, Giuliani and Vivaldi (C) (Essential Classics)
 1991 The Best of John Williams (C) Music Club
 1992 Takemitsu (Sony)
 1992 Iberia (Sony)
 1993 The Seville Concert (Sony)
 1993 Together Again (Expanded Edition on CD) (RCA)
 1993 Together (Expanded Edition on CD) (RCA)
 1994 From Australia (Sony)
 1994 The Great Paraguayan (From The Jungles of Paraguay) (Sony)
 1994 Julian Bream and John Williams Ultimate Collection (C) (BMG)
 1995 George Martin presents the Medici Quartet (Classic FM)
 1996 The Mantis & the Moon (Sony)
 1996 Guitar Concertos by Richard Harvey (Concerto Antico) and Steve Gray (Sony)
 1996 Dodgson and Rodrigo (C) (Essential Classics)
 1996 Guitar Recital - Paganini, Scarlatti, Giuliani & Villa-Lobos (C) (Essential Classics)
 1996 Bach Lute Music: Volume 1 (C) (Essential Classics)
 1996 Bach Lute Music: Volume 2 (C) (Essential Classics)
 1996 John Williams Plays the Movies (and The World of John Williams) (Sony)
 1997 The Black Decameron (Sony)
 1997 The Very Best of John Williams (C) (Crimson)
 1997 Great Expectations (Atlantic)
 1998 In My Life (MCA)
 1998 The Guitarist (Sony)
 1999 Spanish Guitar Favourites (C) (Decca)
 1999 Bach and Scarlatti (C) (Belart)
 1999 Guitar Moods (C) (Decca)
 1999 Great Performances – Rodrigo (C) (Sony)
 1999 Schubert and Giuliani (Sony)
 1999 The Prayer Cycle (Sony)
 1999 When Night Falls (Sony)
 1999 Plague and the Moonflower (Altus)

2000s 
 2000 Classic Williams – Romance of the Guitar (C) (Sony)
 2000 The Essential John Williams (C) (Metro)
 2000 English Guitar Music (C) (Essential Classics)
 2001 The Magic Box (Sony)
 2001 John Williams Plays Bach (C) (Sony) "Music For You"
 2001 Invocación Y Danza (C) (Sony)
 2001 Perpetual Motion (Sony)
 2003 The Guitarist (Expanded Edition) (Sony)
 2003 The Seville Concert (Expanded Edition) (Sony)
 2003 El Diablo Suelto – Guitar Music of Venezuela (with Alfonso Montes) (Sony)
 2004 Rosemary and Thyme (Sanctuary Classics)
 2004 The Ultimate Guitar Collection (2CD) (C) (Sony)
 2005 Bryn Terfel: Simple Gifts (Deutsche Grammophon)
 2005 The Essential John Williams (2CD) (C) (Metro)
 2005 Testament (BBC/Testament)
 2006 Great Performances – Bach Lute Suites (C) (Sony)
 2006 John Williams & John Etheridge: Places Between (Sony)
 2008 Pure Acoustic (West One Music)
 2008 From a Bird (JCW)

2010s 
 2011 The Guitarist (3CD)
 2013 Stepping Stones
 2014 Guitar Concertos
 2016 John Williams The Guitarist - The Complete Columbia Album Collection (58CD and 1 DVD)
 2016 John Williams The Guitar Master (2CD)
 2017 On The Wing
 2019 Vivaldi, Etc.!

References 

Discographies of Australian artists
Discographies of British artists
Rock music discographies